Watco Australia is a rail haulage operator that was formed in 2010 to haul grain for the CBH Group in Western Australia. In 2019, it commenced operating in Queensland under a contract with GrainCorp. It is a subsidiary of Watco.

History
In 2009, CBH Group decided to put its rail grain haulage services out to tender for the first time. This work had previously been performed by the Western Australian Government Railways, Australian Western Railroad and QR National. CBH aimed that the amount of grain transported by rail rise from 50% to 70%. CBH settled on a business model that saw it invest in new locomotives and grain wagons, with day-to-day operations contracted out.

In December 2010, CBH awarded Watco WA Rail a ten-year contract to operate services in the south of Western Australia. To operate the services, CBH purchased 22 CBH class locomotives from MotivePower, Boise, and 574 grain wagons from Bradken, Xuzhou. The cost of this rolling stock was $175 million.

Under the agreement, Watco was responsible for providing a comprehensive rail logistics planning service, including train planning and scheduling, tracking, maintenance, inventory control and crew management. Watco operates and maintains the rolling stock, with ownership remaining with CBH.

The services linked various CBH grain collection points in the wheatbelt with CBH terminal and port facilities in Albany, Geraldton and Kwinana. CBH operate on the Arc Infrastructure managed open access network. Watco transported an average of 10-12 million tonnes (368-441 million bushels) of grain from 192 country reception sites to CBH's four export terminals.

Although the contract officially commenced on 1 May 2012, Watco operated its first service on 30 March 2012. Because of a delay in the delivery of the rolling stock, QR National continued to operate some  gauge services until October 2012, while to operate standard gauge services, locomotives were hired from Chicago Freight Car Leasing Australia and SCT Logistics. A further three locomotives were delivered in 2015 as compensation for late delivery of the original order.

In 2016, Watco Australia was awarded an infrastructure train contract by Brookfield Rail to operate infrastructure trains with two 422 class locomotives purchased from CFCL Australia. In December 2016, Watco acquired a majority shareholding in Intermodal Group, a Western Australian intermodal container transport group. In July 2017, Watco took over the operation of the Forrestfield to Fremantle Harbour intermodal container service from SCT Logistics with flat wagons purchased from CFCL Australia.

In late 2019, Watco Australia commenced operations in Queensland under a seven-year contract with GrainCorp. Eight WRA class locomotives from the National Railway Equipment Company and 128 wagons (designated DGWY) from CRRC in China were ordered. Seven WRB class and one WRC class were repatriated from Transnet Freight Rail in South Africa.

When next tendered, the CBH Group contract was awarded to Aurizon. Although scheduled to transition in May 2022, all parties agreed to bring the handover date forward to September 2021.

Fleet

Watco also operated 25 CBH class and 10 DBZ class locomotives as part of its contract with CBH.

References

External links
Company website

Freight railway companies of Australia
Grain industry of Western Australia
Grain transport in Australia
Railway companies established in 2010
Watco
2010 establishments in Australia